The Côte d'Ivoire – Ghana Cocoa Initiative (CIGCI) is a cocoa cartel set up by the presidents of the two countries to raise cocoa prices. It has been widely referred to as COPEC, in reference to the oil cartel OPEC.

The two countries jointly control 60% of global cocoa production. The cartel in 2019 demanded a $400 premium (corresponding to a 16% markup on the market price) from cocoa buyers called the Living Income Differential (LID).

See also 

 Ghana Cocoa Board

References 

Cartels
Government of Ghana
Government of Ivory Coast